Ecstasy is a solo album by American jazz pianist and composer Steve Kuhn recorded in 1974 and released on the ECM label.

Reception
The Allmusic review by Ken Dryden awarded the album 4 stars stating "Beautifully recorded by engineer Jan Erik Kongshaug, this out of print ECM LP is well worth seeking".

Track listing 
All compositions by Steve Kuhn

 "Silver" - 8:53
 "Prelude in G" - 4:31
 "Ulla" - 7:29
 "Thoughts of a Gentleman - The Saga of Harrison Crabfeathers" - 12:21
 "Life's Backward Glance" - 4:48

Personnel 
 Steve Kuhn – piano

References 

ECM Records albums
Steve Kuhn albums
1975 albums
Albums produced by Manfred Eicher
Solo piano jazz albums